Rahmatollah Hafezi is an Iranian conservative politician who currently serves as a member of the City Council of Tehran and president of its commission of health, environment, and city services.

He previously held office as the vice minister of health for development & resource management between September 2005 and January 2010, as well as head of Social Security Organization.

Hafezi, who entered the council in 2013 with Front of Islamic Revolution Stability support, in August 2016 openly exonerated himself from the party and said that he is non-partisan.

References

1964 births
Living people
Iranian Vice Ministers
Iranian rehabilitation physicians
Alliance of Builders of Islamic Iran politicians
Tehran Councillors 2013–2017
Iranian politicians who have crossed the floor